Ethmia sattleri is a moth in the family Depressariidae. It was described by Andras Kun in 2007. It is found in southern Iran.

Etymology
The species is named for Dr Klaus Sattler, the author of the Ethmiidae volume of the Microlepidoptera Palaearctica series.

References

Moths described in 2007
sattleri